The Liberian Second Division League is the second tier of Liberian football.

Structure
At present, there are eighteen clubs that compete in the Liberian Second Division League. Those eighteen clubs are divided into two zones of ten teams (Zone A) and eight teams (Zone B) playing each other in a home and away series within their respective zones. At the end of the season, the bottom four teams from Zone A and the bottom three teams from Zone B are relegated to the LFA Sub-Committee Leagues (3rd Division). The top team from each zones gain automatic promotion. However, teams positioned second in each zones take part in a promotion play-off. All teams in the Liberian Second Division League take part in the Liberian FA Cup.

2013–14 season

Previous champions

2013–14: FC Fassell (Monrovia)

2021–22: Cece United (Monrovia)

External links
LFA National Leagues

Second Division